Kristen Brooke "K. B." Sharp (born April 18, 1981) is a professional women's basketball player. Sharp has also played for a number of overseas teams.

Early years 
Born in Columbus, Ohio, Sharp attended Bexley High School, in Bexley, Ohio, where she was named all-state (Ohio) in her senior year.  She was named as Honorable Mention All-American by the newspaper USA Today.

University of Cincinnati 
She attended the University of Cincinnati, and majored in Criminal Justice.

(2002–03) Best collegiate season scoring performance, 13.6 ppg, along with averaging 5.7 rpg and 5.9 apg ... All-Conference USA First Team ... Team Captain (2001–02) All-Conference USA Third Team ... Named UC's Most Outstanding Player and earned the team's Ball of Courage and Insane Chain awards... Had 205 assists, breaking her own school record of 170 set as a sophomore ... Played 1,214 minutes, breaking her own school record of 1,207... Earned a spot on the Bearcat Invitational All-Tournament team after averaging 11.5 ppg and 6.0 apg in the two games... (2000–01) Named UC's most outstanding player, averaging 8.3 ppg, 3.6 rpg, team-best of 5.3 apg and 1.5 spg ... Named to the Conference USA all-tournament team after averaging 11.8 ppg and 6.8 apg during the four contests ... (1999-00) Finished fifth on the team in scoring, averaging 5.6 points a game

Cincinnati statistics

Source

WNBA career 
Sharp was chosen in the second round (26th overall) in the 2003 WNBA Draft by the New York Liberty.

She saw action in 30 games in her rookie campaign.  Scored a career high, 14 points on 4-of-7 shooting on June 7 against the Indiana Fever.  She was selected to the WNBA Select team, which competed in international competition.

In 2004, Sharp also played 30 games for the Liberty, but she played less overall minutes than she did in the previous season.

In May 2005, prior to the start of the following WNBA season, she was waived by the Liberty.

In February 2006, she signed a free agent contract with the Indiana Fever.

She then played for the Chicago Sky.

Overseas career
In 2003–04 she played in St. Petersburg, Russia, where she helped lead the team to the EuroCup Championship. She played 10 games for Israel's Hapoel Tel Aviv in 2004–05, where she averaged 14.9 ppg (.603 field goals), 3.8 rpg and 3.5 apg. In 2005–06 she played for Raanana Herzeliya in the Israel's First Division, and in 2006–07, 2007–08 and now in 2008–09, she played for Aix-en-Provence in France.

References

External links
Official Website
WNBA stats

2003 WNBA article of Sharp's trip to Samara, Russia

1981 births
Living people
American expatriate basketball people in France
American expatriate basketball people in Israel
American expatriate basketball people in Russia
American women's basketball players
Basketball players from Columbus, Ohio
Bexley High School alumni
Chicago Sky players
Cincinnati Bearcats women's basketball players
Indiana Fever players
New York Liberty draft picks
New York Liberty players
Shooting guards